Calcium-binding mitochondrial carrier protein SCaMC-1 is a protein that in humans is encoded by the SLC25A24 gene.

Function 

This gene encodes a carrier protein that transports ATP-Mg exchanging it for phosphate. Multiple transcript variants encoding different isoforms have been found for this gene.

References

Further reading

External links 
 

Genes on human chromosome 1
EF-hand-containing proteins
Solute carrier family